Cribrospongiidae is a family of glass sponges in the order Sceptrulophora.

References

External links 
 
 
 

Sponge families
Hexactinosa
Extant Ordovician first appearances